The Benton MacKaye Trail or BMT is a footpath nearly  in length in the Appalachian Mountains in the southeastern United States and is blazed by a white diamond, 5″ across by 7″ tall. The hiking trail was created and is maintained by the Benton MacKaye Trail Association, and it is named for Benton MacKaye, the Massachusetts forester and regional planner who first had the idea for the Appalachian Trail in 1921.

The BMT runs from Springer Mountain in Georgia (sharing the southern terminus of the Appalachian Trail) to Big Creek in the Great Smoky Mountains National Park. The trail passes through seven United States Wilderness Areas, while traversing three states (Georgia, Tennessee and North Carolina). The lowest elevation (765 ft) on the BMT occurs at the crossing of the Hiwassee River in Tennessee. The highest elevation is the  summit of Mt. Sterling in the Great Smoky Mountains of North Carolina.

The trail crosses various trout rivers along its path including Shallowford Bridge and the Swinging Bridge over the Toccoa River in Georgia, the Ocoee, Hiwassee, Upper Bald and Tellico rivers in Tennessee, and the Little Tennessee River in North Carolina. It also crosses Eagle, Hazel, Forney, Noland and Big creeks in the Smokies, along with Fontana Dam and the Oconaluftee River.

References

Benton MacKaye Trail Association (2006). "Benton MacKaye Trail Association". Retrieved March 2, 2006.
Homan, Tim. 2004. Hiking the Benton MacKaye Trail: A guide to the Benton MacKaye trail from Georgia's Springer Mountain to Tennessee's Ocoee River. Peachtree Publishers. .

External links 
 Benton MacKaye Trail Association Official  Site—includes a map
 Trail photos

Hiking trails in Georgia (U.S. state)
Hiking trails in Tennessee
Hiking trails in North Carolina
Long-distance trails in the United States
Chattahoochee-Oconee National Forest
Nantahala National Forest